George Coward (14 May 1915 – 27 April 2009) was an Australian rules footballer who played with Essendon and North Melbourne in the Victorian Football League (VFL).

Notes

External links 

1915 births
2009 deaths
Australian rules footballers from Victoria (Australia)
Essendon Football Club players
North Melbourne Football Club players